Wayne Cotter is an American stand-up comedian.

Cotter attended the University of Pennsylvania where he studied computer engineering.  After college, he became a comedian and made appearances on The Tonight Show, Late Show with David Letterman, and Politically Incorrect.  From 1991 to 1994, he hosted Comic Strip Live, a stand-up comedy series on the Fox television network.

Cotter was one of the comedians featured in The Aristocrats.  He also had a small part in the film Spy Hard. He now performs at corporate events and has appeared at hundreds of events for companies like Intel, IBM, BMW and Deloitte.

References

External links

American stand-up comedians
Living people
University of Pennsylvania alumni
Year of birth missing (living people)